Westside Community Board of Education v. Mergens, 496 U.S. 226 (1990), was a United States Supreme Court case involving a school district's ability to hold classes on Bible study after school.

Background
Westside High School, in District 66, located in Omaha, Nebraska, refused to allow a group of students to form a Christian Bible Study Club within their school. Bridget Mergens is the name of the student who initiated the process to start the club. She was a senior at the time. It was decided that the club could not take place because they would not allow a staff member to sponsor it (staff sponsoring was required or the club meetings could not take place at the school). The students argued that the district's decision was in violation of the federal Equal Access Act requiring that groups seeking to express messages containing "religious, political, philosophical, or other content" not be denied the ability to form clubs.

Opinion  of the Court
In an 8–1 decision, the Court held that denying equal access to the religious club violated the Equal Access Act, and that treating a religious club equally, including providing a sponsor like other clubs, would not constitute an endorsement of religion prohibited by the Establishment Clause of the First Amendment.

The school's situation was placed under the Equal Access Act because it allowed other ‘limited open forums’. In Part III of Justice O'Connor's opinion, which did not reach a majority of the Court, she applied the Lemon Test to find that the Equal Access Act is constitutional as applied in this case. Justice Kennedy, meanwhile, analyzed the application of the Act under different Court precedents, focusing more upon "coercion".

Dissent
Justice Stevens, in a dissenting opinion, would have avoided the Establishment Clause issue.

See also
 List of United States Supreme Court cases, volume 496
 List of United States Supreme Court cases
 Lists of United States Supreme Court cases by volume
 List of United States Supreme Court cases by the Rehnquist Court

References

External links
 

United States Supreme Court cases
Establishment Clause case law
United States Free Speech Clause case law
United States Supreme Court cases of the Rehnquist Court
United States education case law
1990 in United States case law
1990 in religion
1990 in education
Education in Omaha, Nebraska